Philippe Sly (born 1988 or 1989 in Ottawa) is a Canadian bass-baritone and opera, oratorio and recital singer.

Biography 
Sly grew up in Ottawa, joined local boys and adult choirs and studied music at McGill University. In 2011 he was one of the winners of the Metropolitan Opera National Council Auditions, during which time he was taught by Cynthia Hoffmann and receipient of the Choquette-Symcox Award conferred by JM Canada Foundation and Jeunesses Musicales Canada. The following year, 2012, he won the Grand Prize of the Montreal International Musical Competition.

At San Francisco Opera, he joined the company's Merola training program in 2011 and won the SF Opera Adler Fellowship in 2013. Here in June 2013 he debuted as Guglielmo in Cosi fan tutte and in June 2015 as Figaro in Le nozze di Figaro. In June 2017 he debuted in the title role of Don Giovanni at Aix-en-Provence Festival. He sang as Leporello in Don Giovanni at the Opéra de Paris in June 2019 in the new production of Ivo Van Hove.

Recordings 
With Analekta:
 In Dreams (2012): Robert Schumann, Dichterliebe; Maurice Ravel, Don Quichotte à Dulcinée; Guy Ropartz, Quatre poèmes d’après l’intermezzo d’Heinrich Heine; Jonathan Dove, Three Tennyson Songs.
 Rameau: Les Amants trahis (2013)
 Love's Minstrels: English Songs from the 19th and 20th Centuries (2014)
 Schubert Sessions: Lieder with guitar (2016)

Discography

Singles

as featured artist

Songwriting credits
 indicates a background vocal contribution.

References

External links 
 
 Rising Stars: An Interview with Philippe Sly, Opera Warhorses, June 21st, 2015

Living people
Musicians from Ottawa
McGill University School of Music alumni
21st-century Canadian male opera singers
Winners of the Metropolitan Opera National Council Auditions
Year of birth uncertain
1980s births
Canadian bass-baritones
Canadian operatic baritones
Operatic bass-baritones